The 1935 Tour de Hongrie was the 10th edition of the Tour de Hongrie cycle race and was held from 26 to 30 June 1935. The race started and finished in Budapest. The race was won by Károly Németh.

Route

General classification

References

1935
Tour de Hongrie
Tour de Hongrie